Pyewacket may refer to:

 Pyewacket (familiar spirit), a familiar spirit reported by an alleged witch in 1644
 Pyewacket (film), a 2017 Canadian film by Adam MacDonald
 Pyewacket (novel), a 1967 children's novel by Rosemary Weir
 Pye Wacket, an experimental missile
 Pyewacket (yacht), a sailing yacht commissioned in 2004 by Roy E. Disney
 Pyewacket, a fictional cat in Bell, Book and Candle